Mrini is a surname. Notable people with the surname include:

Abdelhak Mrini (born 1934), Moroccan historian, civil servant and writer
Driss Mrini (born 1950), Moroccan film and television director, producer and writer